The Suzuki Lapin is a kei car with a five-door hatchback body, manufactured since 2002 by Suzuki for the Japanese market only, and was also marketed in Japan only by Mazda as Mazda Spiano under an OEM agreement through their Autozam stores until 2008. It is based on Suzuki's popular Alto kei car.

The Lapin has a very distinctive, boxy shape, that apparently proved popular with female buyers. The name "Lapin" stems from the French word for "rabbit", and the car sports rabbit-head badges. The Mazda version has differences concerning some styling details, including a different front end.

The Alto Lapin was awarded the 2008 Japanese Good Design Award.

First-generation HE21S (2002–2008) 

The first-generation Alto Lapin was introduced in January 2002 with three trims, "G","X" and "X2".
The car is powered by the Suzuki's K6A kei car engine, 0.66 L naturally aspirated (40 kW / 54 hp) with either front-wheel drive or all-wheel drive. The default transmission is a four-speed automatic.
 In October 2002, Suzuki launched the "Turbo". It has a turbocharged 44 kW (60 hp) motor and a five-speed manual option.
 In September 2003, the series II model was introduced and two new versions "SS" and "L" were added.
 In October 2004, the series III model was introduced and "L" discontinued.
 In December 2005, the series IV model was introduced and the canvas top version was discontinued.
 In April 2006, the series V model introduced and round-shape headlamps "L" added."X2" version discontinued.
 In May 2007, the series VI model introduced and received new shape front grill.

Second-generation HE22S (2008–2015) 

The second-generation Alto Lapin was introduced in November 2008 with four trims: "G", "X", "T" and "T L package".
CVT was added and manual transmission was dropped.
 In May 2010, all models got CVT and a four-speed auto was discontinued.
 In August 2010, the series II model was introduced.
 In May 2012, the series III model was introduced.

Third-generation HE33S (2015-present) 

The third-generation Lapin was released on 3 June 2015.

The derivative model called Lapin LC was released on 17 June 2022 with LC10 Fronte 360-inspired front fascia.

References 

  (technical data in infoboxes)
 The article incorporates text translated from the corresponding Japanese Wikipedia articles on the Suzuki Alto Lapin as of 17 February 2007.

External links 
 Suzuki Lapin at the official manufacturer's site 
 Mazda Spiano -- fan site

All-wheel-drive vehicles
Front-wheel-drive vehicles
Kei cars
Hatchbacks
Lapin
Retro-style automobiles
Cars introduced in 2002
2010s cars
Vehicles with CVT transmission